Katja Keller (born 9 August 1980, in Karl-Marx-Stadt) is a German heptathlete.

Her personal best is 6130 points, achieved in May 2005 in Götzis.

Achievements

References

1980 births
Living people
German heptathletes
Universiade medalists in athletics (track and field)
Universiade bronze medalists for Germany
Competitors at the 2001 Summer Universiade
Competitors at the 2005 Summer Universiade
Medalists at the 2003 Summer Universiade
20th-century German women
21st-century German women